Allan C. Spradling is an American scientist and principal investigator at the Carnegie Institution for Science and the Howard Hughes Medical Institute who studies egg development in the model organism, Drosophila melanogaster, a fruit fly. He is considered a leading researcher in the developmental genetics of the fruit fly egg and has developed a number of techniques in his career that have led to greater understanding of fruit fly genetics including contributions to sequencing its genome. He is also an adjunct professor at Johns Hopkins University and at the Johns Hopkins University School of Medicine.

Education
Spradling obtained an A.B. in physics from the University of Chicago and a Ph.D. in cell biology from the Massachusetts Institute of Technology.

Career
Spradling and fellow American geneticist Gerald M. Rubin are considered pioneers in the field of genetics for their work in the early 1980s with their idea to "attach" a gene to a Drosophila transposon, P elements, known to insert itself into fruit fly's chromosomes. From this research came work from other scientists on transposons as a tool for genetic alterations in organisms.

In 2003 Spradling was awarded the Beadle Medal and in 2008 Spradling was awarded the Gruber Prize in Genetics for his work on the Drosophila genome and continues his work in investigating novel technological approaches to genetics, egg development and stem cells. He was elected to the American Philosophical Society in 2016.

References

Members of the United States National Academy of Sciences
Living people
American geneticists
University of Chicago alumni
Massachusetts Institute of Technology School of Science alumni
Johns Hopkins University faculty
Howard Hughes Medical Investigators
1949 births
Members of the American Philosophical Society